Ficus subpuberula is a lithophytic fig that is endemic to Australia. It ranges from extreme western Queensland, through the Northern Territory, into Western Australia.

Description

References

Trees of Australia
Flora of Queensland
Flora of the Northern Territory
Rosids of Western Australia
subpuberula
Rosales of Australia
Taxa named by E. J. H. Corner